Chartwell Court is a residential tower block in the centre of Brighton, part of the city of Brighton and Hove, United Kingdom.  The tower is unusual in that is built directly on top of a car park serving the Churchill Square shopping centre.  Construction work started in 1967 and continued until the following year.

Most flats have uninterrupted sea views, and many also have views over the South Downs and the city.

See also

References

Bibliography

Residential buildings completed in 1968
Buildings and structures in Brighton and Hove
Houses in Brighton and Hove
1968 establishments in England